Limb is the surname of:

Allen Limb (1886–1975), Australian cricketer
Ann Limb (born 1953), British educationalist and business leader
Bobby Limb (1924–1999), Australian-born entertainer
Charles Limb, American surgeon and neuroscientist
John O. Limb, Australian engineer
Sue Limb (born 1946), British writer and broadcaster
Thomas Limb (1850–1901), English cricketer